The flag of Batangas is the provincial flag of Batangas, Philippines. It is a horizontal triband of blue, white and red — the main colors of the Philippine flag — with the provincial seal in the center.

Specifications
The flag has a width-to-length proportion of 1:2.

History
The current flag design was adopted in 2009, and is known as the "Vilma Santos-Recto Administration Provincial Flag" due to being adopted during Governor Vilma Santos-Recto's term.

The previous flag of Batangas was a predominantly white flag with a narrow blue stripe at the bottom. This stripe was surmounted by the words "BATANGAS PROVINCE" and a gold-colored bull, courant toward the provincial seal located on the upper part of the fly. This flag was replaced due to its resemblance to the flag of the U.S. state of California. 

Other proposals considered in replacing the old flag involved: incorporating the image of revered Katipunan figure and Batangas native Apolinario Mabini; incorporating a chevron design; and restoring the old flag format of a plain purple flag with the updated provincial seal in the center.

References

flag
Batangas
Batangas
Flags displaying animals